BC Ternopil is a Ukrainian basketball club based in Ternopil. Founded in 2017, the team made its debut in the Ukrainian Basketball Superleague in 2020.

Players

Current squad

Squad changes 2020–21

In 

|}

Notable players

References

Basketball teams in Ukraine
Basketball teams established in 2017
Sport in Kharkiv
2017 establishments in Ukraine